Osagie Ederaro (born 25 August 1986 in Nigeria) is a Nigerian former professional footballer who was last contracted to Green Gully in Australia.

Career

Singapore
Released by Balestier Khalsa in winter 2005 after the expiry of his contract, Ederaro re-joined them just before the 2006 S.League season, claiming that he was satisfied there and rejecting offers from rivals Geylang, finishing with 9 goals that year.

Australia
In spring 2008, at Wollongong Wolves, Ederaro formed a strike partnership with Ilija Prenzoski, together scoring four goals in two weeks straight previously.

Inundated with problems relating to his rent while with Wollongong Wolves, the Nigerian striker left the club because of this reason by September 2008.

Awards
VPL Team of the Week (3)
 Green Gully SC Player of the Season (1): 2014

References

External links 
 at ZeroZero

Nigerian expatriate footballers
1986 births
Expatriate footballers in Singapore
Balestier Khalsa FC players
Green Gully SC players
Wollongong Wolves FC players
Nigerian footballers
Living people
Association football forwards
Singapore Premier League players
Heidelberg United FC players
Nigerian expatriate sportspeople in Australia
Expatriate soccer players in Australia